Mark Gregory Andrews (born 21 February 1972 in Elliot, Eastern Cape (then Cape Province), South Africa) is a former rugby union player.

Career
He achieved his Junior Springbok colours in waterpolo while still at school. He switched to rugby union as his main sport and achieved honours while at school and was selected for the  schools team to play at the 1990 Craven Week tournament. While at university he was selected for the SA Student team in 1993 and the SA Universities team in 1994. He played for 's winning Currie Cup team in 1995 and 1996.

Andrews made his international test debut for South Africa on 11 June 1994 against England in Cape Town. He went on to play 77 test and 13 mid-week games for South Africa. Andrews formed a formidable lock combination with Kobus Wiese and later Krynauw Otto. During his test career he scored 12 tries for a tally of 60 test points.

He was part of the 1995 Rugby World Cup winning team alongside another native of Elliot, prop Os du Randt.

International statistics

Test Match record

Pld = Games Played, W = Games Won, D = Games Drawn, L = Games Lost, Tri = Tries Scored, Pts = Points Scored

Test tries (12)

World Cup matches
 Champions  Runners-up  Third place  Fourth place

See also
List of South Africa national rugby union players – Springbok no. 602

References

External links
Profile

1972 births
Living people
South African people of British descent
Rugby union locks
South African rugby union players
South Africa international rugby union players
Alumni of Selborne College
Sharks (Currie Cup) players
Sharks (rugby union) players
Rugby union players from the Eastern Cape